The Pacific antwren or Pacific streaked antwren (Myrmotherula pacifica) is a species of bird in the family Thamnophilidae. It is found in Colombia, Ecuador and Panama, living in forests, clearings, woodland verges and gardens.

Taxonomy
The Pacific antwren was first described in 1911 by the Austrian ornithologist Carl Eduard Hellmayr. It was at one time considered to be conspecific with the Guianan streaked antwren (Myrmotherula surinamensis) and the Amazonian streaked antwren (Myrmotherula multostriata) but the three have different songs and there are certain differences in their plumage.

Description
The male is similar in morphology to the Amazonian streaked antwren and the Guianan streaked antwren, having black upper parts streaked with white, two white wingbars and white underparts streaked with black. The female is also similar to the females of those two species, but has a more orange-rufous head, dark streaking on the crown, and unstreaked buff underparts. The Pacific antwren is not likely to be confused with those two species as it is found exclusively west of the Andes, while they only occur to the east. The song is a fast, lively series of staccato notes, ascending slightly in pitch. Other calls include "chee-cher" and "chee-pu", uttered by both sexes.

Distribution and habitat
It is found in damp rainforests, at the edges of woodland, in glades and in gardens, foraging for insects in the sub-canopy of trees, and often far from watercourses.

Status
Myrmotherula pacifica has a very wide range and is able to adapt to living in secondary forest. It is a fairly common bird with a stable population size and the International Union for Conservation of Nature has assessed its conservation status as being "least concern".

References

Pacific antwren
Birds of Panama
Birds of the Tumbes-Chocó-Magdalena
Pacific antwren
Pacific antwren
Taxonomy articles created by Polbot